"Big Bad Wolf" is a song by American–Canadian DJ duo Duck Sauce. It was released on 29 September 2011 by Spinnin' Records. The song peaked at number seventy-nine on the UK Singles Chart.

Music video
Billboard described it as "the most disturbing video of 2011". The magazine also described it as "the most frightening video of 2011". Directed by Keith Schofield, the video features different people with human heads as their genitalia.

Usage in media
In the 2011-12 season after Jason Roberts signed for Reading, the song became his (and the clubs) unofficial anthem. Being played before every home game during April as well as during their lap of honour and in the changing rooms when celebrating promotion.

The song also became the unofficial anthem of the Red Bull Racing Formula One team. During their successful 2011 season, upon winning that weekend's Grand Prix, the team's mechanics would play the song at a very high volume during the packing up. This would often interrupt broadcasters during their post race shows.

In 2016, the song was used in an advertising campaign for Money Supermarket.

Track listing
 US Digital download
 "Big Bad Wolf" (Radio Edit) - 2:58
 "Big Bad Wolf" (Gesaffelstein Remix) - 5:22

UK Digital download
 "Big Bad Wolf" (UK Radio Edit) - 2:06
 "Big Bad Wolf" (Original Mix) - 4:53
 "Big Bad Wolf" (Gesaffelstein Mix) - 5:22
 "Big Bad Wolf" (Toddla T Radio Edit) - 3:29
 "Big Bad Wolf" (Toddla T Mix) - 4:21
 "Big Bad Wolf" (Dada Life Remix) - 5:14

Dutch digital download
 "Big Bad Wolf" - 4:53

Charts

Release history

References

Songs about wolves
2011 singles
2011 songs
Big Beat Records (American record label) singles
Duck Sauce songs
House music songs
Songs written by Armand Van Helden